Rubens Francisco Minelli (born 19 December 1928) is a Brazilian former football player and manager.

As a player, he played for Ypiranga, Nacional (SP), Palmeiras, Taubaté and São Bento, where he ended his career after broken a leg when he was 27.

After any years he started his career as a manager for América, after have coached many clubs of Brazil, like, Internacional, São Paulo, Palmeiras, Grêmio, Paraná, Sport, Francana, Corinthians, Santos, Portuguesa, Guarani, Ponte Preta, Rio Branco, Ferroviária, Atlético Mineiro and Coritiba. Later, he moved abroad to manage Al-Hilal and Saudi Arabia National Team in Saudi Arabia.

Honours
América(SP)
 Campeonato Paulista Série A2: 1963

Sport Club Recife
 Campeonato Pernambucano: 1966

Palmeiras
 Torneio Roberto Gomes Pedrosa: 1969

Sport Club Internacional
 Campeonato Brasileiro Série A: 1975 and 1976
 Campeonato Gaúcho: 1974, 1975 and 1976

Associação Atlética Francana
 Campeonato Paulista Série A2: 1977

São Paulo Futebol Clube
 Campeonato Brasileiro Série A: 1977

Al-Hilal
 Crown Prince Cup: 1979/1980

Grêmio Foot-Ball Porto Alegrense
 Campeonato Gaúcho: 1985;

Paraná Clube
 Campeonato Paranaense: 1993, 1994 and 1997

References

1928 births
Living people
Footballers from São Paulo
Brazilian footballers
Brazilian football managers
Expatriate football managers in Saudi Arabia
Campeonato Brasileiro Série A managers
Brazilian people of Italian descent
Nacional Atlético Clube (SP) players
São Paulo FC players
Esporte Clube Taubaté players
Esporte Clube São Bento players
América Futebol Clube (SP) managers
Botafogo Futebol Clube (SP) managers
Sport Club do Recife managers
Associação Atlética Francana managers
Guarani FC managers
Sociedade Esportiva Palmeiras managers
Associação Portuguesa de Desportos managers
Rio Preto Esporte Clube managers
Sport Club Internacional managers
São Paulo FC managers
Al Hilal SFC managers
Clube Atlético Mineiro managers
Grêmio Foot-Ball Porto Alegrense managers
Sport Club Corinthians Paulista managers
Paraná Clube managers
Rio Branco Esporte Clube managers
Santos FC managers
Esporte Clube XV de Novembro (Piracicaba) managers
Associação Ferroviária de Esportes managers
Coritiba Foot Ball Club managers
Association football wingers